Etowah is an unincorporated community and census-designated place (CDP) in Henderson County, North Carolina, United States. The population was 6,944 at the 2010 census. It is part of the Asheville Metropolitan Statistical Area.

History
Bryn Avon was listed on the National Register of Historic Places in 1999.

Geography
Etowah is located in western Henderson County at  (35.315560, -82.596915), in the valley of the French Broad River. It is bordered to the north by the town of Mills River, to the northeast by unincorporated Horse Shoe, and to the west by Transylvania County.

U.S. Route 64 passes through Etowah, leading east  to Hendersonville and southwest  to Brevard.

Demographics

2020 census

As of the 2020 United States census, there were 7,642 people, 3,411 households, and 2,408 families residing in the CDP.

2000 census
As of the census of 2000, there were 2,766 people, 1,280 households, and 938 families residing in the CDP. The population density was 603.6 people per square mile (233.2/km2). There were 1,365 housing units at an average density of 297.9 per square mile (115.1/km2). The racial makeup of the CDP was 96.78% White, 1.70% African American, 0.14% Native American, 0.58% Asian, 0.14% Pacific Islander, 0.14% from other races, and 0.51% from two or more races. Hispanic or Latino of any race were 0.87% of the population.

There were 1,280 households, out of which 18.7% had children under the age of 18 living with them, 63.7% were married couples living together, 7.0% had a female householder with no husband present, and 26.7% were non-families. 24.7% of all households were made up of individuals, and 13.7% had someone living alone who was 65 years of age or older. The average household size was 2.16 and the average family size was 2.53.

In the CDP, the population was spread out, with 15.8% under the age of 18, 5.4% from 18 to 24, 21.6% from 25 to 44, 27.6% from 45 to 64, and 29.7% who were 65 years of age or older. The median age was 51 years. For every 100 females, there were 92.5 males. For every 100 females age 18 and over, there were 89.4 males.

The median income for a household in the CDP was $38,438, and the median income for a family was $45,041. Males had a median income of $30,525 versus $22,212 for females. The per capita income for the CDP was $20,849. About 2.3% of families and 5.9% of the population were below the poverty line, including 7.7% of those under age 18 and 6.2% of those age 65 or over.

References

Census-designated places in Henderson County, North Carolina
Census-designated places in North Carolina
Asheville metropolitan area